Vicki Paski (born 16 October 1955) is a pool player from the United States and member of the Women's Professional Billiard Association Hall of Fame.

Biography
Vicki Paski was born on 16 October 1955. She started playing pool whilst studying for a degree in business at Lansing Community College, when she took the course "Pocket Billiards 101." She continued to practice at the club where the course was held, called the Velvet Rail, and won her first tournament at the age of 18. Paski was one of the attendees at the inaugural meeting of the Women's Professional Billiard Association (WPBA) in 1976.

Her playing career included reaching two world championship finals. She was the 1979 World Nine-ball Runner-up and 1981 World 14.1 Runner-up.

Paski served as President of the WPBA, and in 1987 became the first woman pool analyst for ESPN. Her playing nickname is Diamond Vic.

She became a member of the Women's Professional Billiard Association Hall of Fame, for Meritorious Service, in 2005, and was inducted into the Greater Lansing Area Sports Hall of Fame in 2011.

Achievements 
Source: Greater Lansing Area Sports Hall of Fame

1976 National Amateur Champion
1979 World Nine-ball Runner-up
1980 All-American Trick Shot Champion
1981 World 14.1 Runner-up
1982 National Nine-ball Champion
1982 Pool & Billiard Magazine Player of the Year
1982 and 1983 BCA National Eight-ball Championship Team

References

1955 births
American pool players
Female pool players
Living people